Pectinimura gilvicostata is a moth in the family Lecithoceridae. It is found in Papua New Guinea.

The length of the forewings is 7.5–8 mm. The forewings are densely covered with uniform brownish grey scales and there is a broad orange white band from the base to the apex along the costa, as well as a large dark-brown discal spot at the end of the cell. There are dark-brownish small spots along the termen and the costa is nearly straight, dark brown for one-fourth the length anteriorly.

Etymology
The species name refers to the orange white band on the costa and is derived from Latin gilvus (meaning pale yellow or orange white).

References

Moths described in 2011
gilvicostata